Mark Webster may refer to:

Mark Webster (journalist) (born 1953), British journalist and broadcaster
Mark Webster (presenter), British sports presenter
Mark Webster (darts player) (born 1983), Welsh darts player
Mark Webster (figure skater) (born 1990), Australian figure skater